The 46th Walker Cup Match was played September 9 and 10, 2017 at the Los Angeles Country Club in Los Angeles, California. It was the second Walker Cup Match played in California, the previous occasion being in 1981 at Cypress Point Club. Great Britain and Ireland were the holders of the cup. The United States won the match 19 points to 7.

Format
On Saturday, there were four matches of foursomes in the morning and eight singles matches in the afternoon. On Sunday, there were again four matches of foursomes in the morning, followed by ten singles matches (involving every player) in the afternoon. In all, 26 matches were played.

Each of the 26 matches was worth one point in the larger team competition. If a match is all square after the 18th hole extra holes are not played. Rather, each side earns ½ a point toward their team total. The team that accumulates at least 13½ points wins the competition. In the event of a tie, the previous winner retains the Cup.

Teams
Ten players for the USA and Great Britain & Ireland played in the event plus a non-playing captain for each team. Harry Ellis was an automatic selection for the Great Britain & Ireland team having won the 2017 Amateur Championship. The two teams were announced following the U.S. Amateur.

Note: "Rank" is the World Amateur Golf Ranking as of the start of the Cup.

Craig Watson was the original captain of the Great Britain and Ireland team but withdrew on August 30 because of a family illness.

Saturday's matches

Morning foursomes

Afternoon singles

Sunday's matches

Morning foursomes

Afternoon singles

References

External links
USGA site
R&A site
The Los Angeles Country Club coverage
Golf Bible Walker Cup coverage

Walker Cup
Golf in California
Sports competitions in Los Angeles
Walker Cup
Walker Cup
Walker Cup